Agios Vartholomaios (before 1926: Βαρθολώμ - Vartholom renamed until 1928: Βαρθολομαίος - Vartholomaios) is a village in Florina regional unit, Western Macedonia, Greece.

According to the statistics of Vasil Kanchov ("Macedonia, Ethnography and Statistics"), 360 Muslim Albanians lived in the village in 1900.
The Greek census (1920) recorded 487 people in the village and in 1923 there were 447 inhabitants (or 80 families) who were Muslim. Following the Greek-Turkish population exchange, in 1926 within Vartholom there were refugee families from  Asia Minor (3), Pontus (41) and the Caucasus (51). The Greek census (1928) recorded 219 village inhabitants. There were 94 refugee families (353 people) in 1928. The village mosque with a tall minaret was destroyed.

Agios Vartholomaios had 200 inhabitants in 1981. In fieldwork done by Riki Van Boeschoten in late 1993, Agios Vartholomaios was populated by a Greek population descended from Anatolian Greek refugees who arrived during the population exchange. Pontic Greek was spoken by people over 60, mainly in private.

References

Populated places in Florina (regional unit)